Anand Pandit is an Indian film producer, film distributor and real estate developer. He owns Anand Pandit Motion Pictures, a film studio that produces and distributes Bollywood films such as Total Dhamaal (2019), Missing (2018), Sarkar 3 (2018), and Great Grand Masti (2016).  Recently, Anand Pandit has also produced a Gujarati film Fakt Mahilao Maate (2022) that did extremely well at the Box office. He has also produced several other films, including Thank God, The Big Bull and Chehre. He is the founder of Lotus Developers, which develops high-end real estate in Mumbai, Maharashtra.

Career
Pandit entered the media and film industry in 2000 and has produced, distributed and financed multiple Bollywood films.

Producer Anand Pandit forays into the South Indian industry with Kannada film Kabzaa (2023 film) which will be released in Hindi (dubbed) as Underworld Ka Kabzaa. The film will hit the screens in Hindi as well as the four South Indian languages on March 17, 2023.

In 2022, Anand Pandit co-produced a blockbuster Gujrati film Fakt Mahilao Maate. He was a distributor for Doctor G and produced Thank God (film). His  Marathi film Victoria, released on 16 December 2022 and shooting has begun for his next Marathi film, Baap Maanus starring Pushkar Jog and Anusha Dandekar. In March, 2022 Pandit also announced his upcoming film Bal Shivaji, directed by Ravi Jadhav. Anand Pandit is also producing Swatantrya Veer Savarkar, a film based on the life of Veer Savarkar, starring Randeep Hooda which is slated to release on 26 May 2023.

In 2020 and 2021, Pandit had two films release the same day  The Big Bull on Disney+ Hotstar and Well Done Baby, a Marathi film on Amazon Prime Video. His most recent film as a producer is titled Chehre.  The film had been postponed for theatrical release several times due to COVID-19 pandemic and was released on 27 August 2021 in theaters.

Real Estate 
Anand Pandit spearheads Lotus Developers – a major real estate development company based in Mumbai, India. It has designed and delivered some of the iconic real estate projects in Mumbai viz. Lotus Tower, Lotus Business Park, Lotus Corporate Park, Lotus Mid-Town , Lotus Grandeur etc

Having delivered millions of square feet in Mumbai, they have set a new benchmark in luxury residential and commercial real estate.

Fuelled by the ambition to create exemplary buildings and coupled with the legacy of timely delivery, they have gained the trust of thousands of clients including top celebrities, multinationals & corporates.

Filmography

References

External links

Film directors from Gujarat
Living people
People from Ahmedabad
Year of birth missing (living people)